Anamosa State Penitentiary is a maximum security penitentiary prison located in the Jones County community of Anamosa, Iowa – approximately  northeast of Cedar Rapids, Iowa.

Prison Operation

As of 21 February 2016, the penitentiary was home to approximately 855 inmates with another 175 in segregation and has 357 staff members. Inmates working in the Iowa Prison Industries produce metal stamping, custom wood, printing, metal furniture, sign, and cleaning products at the penitentiary.  The penitentiary also offers educational services, and has a contract with a community college for such services.  The prison offers vocational training in welding, automobile repair, horticultural, and janitorial services. Inmates also are able to take courses to earn a high school diploma or a GED, or can take coursework towards an Associate of Arts degree. The prison also offers substance abuse treatment programs for those inmates with drug and/or alcohol problems.

Supporting the Treatment and Security functions of the prison there is also a comprehensive program of religious services, physical, and creative activities.

A.S.P. Religion Center:  This offers an expanding variety of services, programs, and studies from multiple faith groups.  These include (listed alphabetically): Asatru, Buddhist, Christian (Catholic, Liturgical Protestant, Pentecostal & Gospel), Jehovah's Witnesses, Moorish Science Temple of America, Muslim (Sunni), Nation of Gods and Earths, Native American sacred ceremonies, Satanist, and Wicca.  The program is supported by 60+ regular volunteers who are clergy and lay authorities in their various faith groups.

Activities areas also allow inmates to be positively occupied in various team sports through the gym.  The hobby/craft area allows them to work with creative arts and crafts such as pottery, leather work, and woodworking.  Finally the music department provides an opportunity to be involved in the performing arts as soloists and small bands.

All of the ancillary programs (Religion, Sports, Music, and Hobby Craft) seek to support generally positive interactions between individuals, establish a sense of teamwork that supports Treatment and Security goals.

The penitentiary also maintains a satellite minimum security institution for up to 80 inmates at the Luster Heights Prison Farm. This is located in the northeastern corner of the state in the Yellow River State Forest near Harpers Ferry, all in Allamakee County.

The prison also has a golf course which was built by John Wayne Gacy in the late 1960s. The prison also had a Jaycees chapter.

Anamosa State Penitentiary Museum

The Anamosa State Penitentiary Museum is located just outside the penitentiary's walls in a stone building that was formerly a barn and then a cheese-making facility for the prison.  Exhibits include the history of the prison, the role of prison guards and the construction of the buildings.  The museum is open seasonally and features a gift shop.

Notable inmates
 Jerry Lynn Burns, convicted killer of Michelle Martinko
 John Wayne Gacy, serial killer, served time here for sodomy with a minor from 1968 to 1970.
 Harry Edward Greenwell, posthumously identified as the "I-65 Killer." Served time here for burglary and escape in 1982.
 Robert Hansen, serial killer, served time here for arson in the early 1960s.
 Shawn Bentler, mass murderer from Bonaparte, Iowa. He murdered his parents and three sisters, it was claimed, to inherit his family's fortune.
 Chai Vang, mass murderer who shot and killed six people and injured two in Meteor, Wisconsin on 21 November 2004.

See also
 List of Iowa state prisons

References

External links
 Anamosa State Penitentiary Museum

Anamosa, Iowa
Prisons in Iowa
Buildings and structures in Jones County, Iowa
Museums in Jones County, Iowa
Prison museums in the United States
Historic districts on the National Register of Historic Places in Iowa
National Register of Historic Places in Jones County, Iowa
Historic districts in Jones County, Iowa
1899 establishments in Iowa